Uri Meir Possen was a professor in the Department of Economics at Cornell University, and was the chair of that department. He died December 12, 2012.

References

1940s births
2012 deaths
Yale University alumni
Cornell University faculty